Thimelby is a surname. Notable people with the surname include:

Gertrude Aston Thimelby (1617–1668), English poet, author, and nun
Mary Thimelby (1610–1690), English prioress
Richard Thimelby (1614–1672), English Jesuit missionary priest

See also
Thymelby

English-language surnames